Hypanartia lethe, the orange admiral or orange mapwing, is a butterfly of the family Nymphalidae.

Description
Forewings are black with orange-brown spots and an orange-brown fascia composed by a few blotches. Hindwings are orange brown, with a row of black spots in the marginal area and a black narrow strip in the submarginal area near the apex. The underside of the wings shows an ornate pattern and a pale brown coloration resembling the contour lines of a topographic map (hence the common name orange mapwing). Adults have two hindwing tails of variable length.

Biology
Larvae feed on Phenax, Boehmeria, Celtis, Sponia and Trema micrantha.

Distribution and habitat
This common and widespread species can be found in Texas, Mexico - Peru, Trinidad, Venezuela, Argentina, Paraguay, Uruguay and Brazil.

Gallery

References

External links
 Butterflies of America

Nymphalini
Butterflies described in 1793
Taxa named by Johan Christian Fabricius